Tungsram Sport Club was a Hungarian football club from the town of Budapest, Hungary. The club was affiliated with the Tungsram Hungarian company.

History
Tungsram Sport Club debuted in the 1954 season of the Hungarian League and finished ninth.

Name Changes 
1911–?: Ampére SE
1951–1957: ÚTE Izzó
1957–1959: Újpesti Tungsram TE
1959–?: Budapesti Vasas Izzó SK
?-1980: Vasas Izzó Sportkör
1980: merger with Váci Híradás Vasas SE 
1980–?: Tungsram SC
?-?: Tungsram-Pulzus SC
?-1999: Tungsram SC

Managers
 Géza Kalocsay (1954–1955)

References

External links
 Profile

Football clubs in Hungary
1911 establishments in Hungary